Mount Wuming is a mountain in Xiulin Township, Hualien County, Taiwan with an elevation of .

See also 
List of mountains in Taiwan

References 

Landforms of Taichung
Wuming